Klimenti Tsitaishvili (born 5 January 1979) is a retired football striker from Georgia.

He played for the main squad of FC Chernomorets Novorossiysk in the Russian Premier League Cup.

His son Heorhiy Tsitaishvili is also a professional player, a midfielder for KKS Lech Poznań, who won the 2019 FIFA U-20 World Cup playing for Ukraine.

References

External links
 Profile at anorthosisfc.com

1979 births
Living people
Association football forwards
Footballers from Georgia (country)
Georgia (country) under-21 international footballers

FC Zugdidi players
FC Shevardeni-1906 Tbilisi players
FC Dinamo Tbilisi players
Hapoel Rishon LeZion F.C. players
Bnei Yehuda Tel Aviv F.C. players
Hapoel Tzafririm Holon F.C. players
FC Kolkheti-1913 Poti players
Anorthosis Famagusta F.C. players
AEL Limassol players
AEK Larnaca FC players
Nea Salamis Famagusta FC players

Erovnuli Liga players
Liga Leumit players
Israeli Premier League players
Cypriot First Division players

Expatriate footballers from Georgia (country)
Expatriate footballers in Israel
Expatriate sportspeople from Georgia (country) in Israel
Expatriate footballers in Cyprus
Expatriate sportspeople from Georgia (country) in Cyprus
Expatriate footballers in Russia
Expatriate sportspeople from Georgia (country) in Russia

Football managers from Georgia (country)
FC Zugdidi managers